"Mood" is a song by American rapper 24kGoldn featuring Puerto Rican rapper Iann Dior. It was released on July 24, 2020, through Records and Columbia Records, as the lead single  from the former's debut studio album, El Dorado (2021). The pop rap and rap rock song is built around a guitar riff inspired by indie rock and post grunge music, and also features hi-hats and snare drums in the style of trap music. On the song, 24kGoldn and Dior sing-rap about their toxic relationships in which their lovers are always in a "mood".

The song came about while the artists were playing Call of Duty together and producers Omer Fedi and KBeaZy were working on a beat, and 24kGoldn idly sang what would become the song's hook. After an early version of the song was completed, Blake Slatkin was soon brought on as a producer to make the song more pop-oriented. It became a commercial success after earning popularity on the video-sharing app TikTok, and was certified quadruple platinum by the Recording Industry Association of America (RIAA). "Mood" peaked at number one on the Billboard Hot 100, where it spent eight non-consecutive weeks, and also topped the charts in the United Kingdom, Australia, Ireland, Austria, Denmark, the Netherlands, Norway, and Sweden. It also reached number two on the Global 200. "Mood" was positively received by critics, who praised it as being catchy, and it was included on lists of the best songs of 2020 published by Slate, Billboard, and The New York Times.

24kGoldn and Dior performed the song live at the 2020 MTV Europe Music Awards preshow, the American Music Awards of 2020, the season 19 finale of The Voice, Dick Clark's New Year's Rockin' Eve, Jimmy Kimmel Live!, and The Ellen DeGeneres Show. A music video for "Mood", in which 24kGoldn and Dior have disputes with two separate girls, was released on August 5, 2020, and directed by Sebastian Sdaigui. A remix of the song with Canadian singer-songwriter Justin Bieber and Colombian singer-songwriter J Balvin was released on November 6, 2020.

Background and promotion

According to 24kGoldn and Dior, they were playing Call of Duty while the song's producers, Fedi and KBeazy, were working on a beat, and as Fedi played a guitar riff, 24kGoldn idly began singing along with it. 24kGoldn then created a hook for the song while Dior performed a verse. After an early version of the song was written and produced by the four, producer Blake Slatkin was brought in to give the track a "pop polish".

24kGoldn teased a snippet of the song on his Instagram account before the song was officially released on July 24, 2020. To promote "Mood", Columbia Records pitched the song to various pop and "Gen Z" playlists on popular music streaming services. 24kGoldn's team also pitched the song to pop radio stations, and it quickly found success on contemporary hit radio. Video-sharing platform TikTok was also used as part of the marketing strategy to promote "Mood", and the song went from being used in approximately 12,000 videos on the platform in mid-August to over two million by October. 24kGoldn also used his own money to fund marketing campaigns for the song and get promotions from social media influencers.

Composition
"Mood" is an uptempo pop rap and rap rock song, described by several publications as "genre-bending". According to sheet music published by Musicnotes.com and provided by Universal Music Publishing Group, the song is written in common time in the key of G minor with a tempo of 91 beats per minute, and 24kGoldn and Dior's vocals range from a low of F3 to a high of G4. Its instrumental includes an indie and post-grunge-influenced guitar riff played by Omer Fedi (which is warped and echoed at points throughout the song), and "trap-style" hi-hats and snare drums.

In the song, 24kGoldn and Dior deliver "melodic croons" about their girlfriends who are always in a "mood", in a sing-song rapping style. Described by Vicky Inoyo of Earmilk as a love-centered song that provides "a youthful feel with modern-day pop twists", the lyrics detail how it feels to be in a toxic relationship. Tom Breihan of Stereogum wrote, "the two rappers don't really rap. Instead, they mewl everything in a familiar nasal whine-bleat." Varietys Charlie Amter wrote that the lyrics to the song's pre-chorus, "We play games of love to avoid the depression/We been here before/And I won't be your victim", are "morose", while Breihan described the pre-chorus as "a hymn to horny self-pity" and Slates Chris Molanphy called it "very emo" and "Gen Z". Billboard similarly remarked that the song is "emo-leaning". HotNewHipHops Alexander Cole called the track "perfect for summer", and said the song's title "certainly fits the vibe as we get a very summer-inspired beat". Rolling Stones Ethan Millman called the beat of the song "bright" and "beachy" and the melody "carefree".

Critical reception and accolades
For Billboard, Carl Lamarre stated that the song was a "feel-good record" and a "late-summer bop", describing the hook as "catchy", while Josh Glicksman of the same publication called the chorus "easily digestible" and "sonically light". Another Billboard writer, Andrew Unterberger, remarked that the song's energy felt "impossibly fresh" and that it is a "visceral banger". Chris Molanphy of Slate called the song "fiendishly catchy" and also praised the track's hook, opining that it was "one of the most instantly infectious rap-rock refrains ever". In his review of El Dorado, Kyann-Sian Williams of NME wrote that "Mood" was "spritely" and "tacked on at the end [of El Dorado] to act as a smug victory lap in the face of doubters". In another review of the album, Stereogums Chris DeVille stated, "like hits from forebears like Juice WRLD, Post Malone, and Lil Uzi Vert, 'Mood' was self-evidently a pop song, infectiously catchy and irresistibly propulsive." DeVille added that the song "gracefully avoided" descending into the "unlistenable cheese" that the other pop-rock songs on the album did. Joe Coscarelli of The New York Times called "Mood" a "melodic-rap confection". KROQ-FM program director Mike Kaplan stated that "Mood" was "one of those first-listen records".

Slates Chris Molanphy named "Mood" as the 12th best single of 2020, while Billboard named it the eighth best song, the third best rock song, and the 12th best musical TikTok trend of the year. On Jon Caramanica's list of the best songs of 2020 in The New York Times, "Mood" was added as an honorable mention. "Mood" was nominated for Best Collaboration at the 2021 iHeartRadio Music Awards. The song was also nominated for Top Hot 100 Song, Top Collaboration, and Top Rap Song at the 2021 Billboard Music Awards.

Commercial performance
In its first week after being released, "Mood" sold 15,000 units. Following the song's viral TikTok success, "Mood" debuted on the US Billboard Hot 100 at number 84 in August 2020. After ten weeks of climbing the chart, the song reached number one on the chart dated October 24, when it received 20.3 million streams, sold 7,000 downloads, and made 62.9 million radio impressions. It became both 24kGoldn's and Dior's first number one on the chart, as well as Dior's first entry on the chart, and the first number one for any artist on the Records label. It also topped Billboards Hot Rock & Alternative Songs, Hot Alternative Songs, and Hot Rap Songs charts, making it the first song to simultaneously top all four charts, and went on to top the Hot 100 for eight non-consecutive weeks. It also tied with Drake's "Nice for What" with the most climbs to the top spot at four when it returned to number one for a seventh non-consecutive week on the week ending January 9, 2021. "Mood" logged a 30th week inside the Hot 100's top ten, being the 12th song to do so.

"Mood" peaked at number one on the Mainstream Top 40 chart for eight consecutive weeks and broke the Mainstream Top 40 spin record, previously held by Ed Sheeran's 2017 song "Shape of You", by logging 17,748 plays among the chart's reporting stations for the week of November 22, 17,707 plays. The song also had the longest run at number one on Mediabase's pop radio chart in 2020, with eight weeks. Following its debut on the Rolling Stone Top 100 in mid-August, "Mood" rose to the top of the chart after earning 20.6 million streams for the week dated November 6, 2020, where it spent two non-consecutive weeks. The song went on to be certified double platinum by the Recording Industry Association of America (RIAA) on December 1, 2020.

In the United Kingdom, "Mood" debuted at number 51 on the UK Singles Chart for the week ending August 27, 2020. After spending five weeks on the chart, the song topped the chart in the week ending October 1, 2020, after earning 61,000 chart sales and 7.8 million streams, and stayed at number one for four consecutive weeks. "Mood" also reached number one on the
Australian ARIA Charts, where it spent eleven non-consecutive weeks at number one. It spent four weeks at the top spot on the Irish Singles Chart. The song topped the charts in several other countries as well, including the Austrian Ö3 Austria Top 40, Denmark's Tracklisten, the Dutch Single Top 100, Norway's VG-lista, and the Swedish Sverigetopplistan.

Live performances and cover versions
24kGoldn and Dior made their debut television performance of "Mood" on Jimmy Kimmel Live! on October 26, 2020, followed by a performance on The Ellen DeGeneres Show on November 5, 2020, opening with a skit before singing the song on a sunflower-themed set. Later that month, they performed the track at the preshow for the 2020 MTV Europe Music Awards and at the 48th Annual American Music Awards, the latter of which was identified as a high of the night by Justin Curto of Vulture. The two went on to perform the song during the season 19 finale of the NBC television series The Voice, and also performed the song for ABC's Dick Clark's New Year's Rockin' Eve television special for 2021.

English psychedelic pop band Glass Animals performed a cover of "Mood" for BBC Radio 1's Live Lounge program in November 2020. That same month, American post-hardcore band Our Last Night performed a cover of the song.

Music video
The song's official video, directed by Sebastian Sdaigui, was released on August 5, 2020. It includes several different scenes. During Dior's verse, he is depicted in a "bleak" room with a girl, going from having romantic moments with her to arguing with her. During 24kGoldn's verse, he is shown sitting in a car with a different girl, who sees him texting someone and angrily leaves the car before picking up a baseball bat and threatening him with it. The video also shows the two in two different sunflower-themed sets, as well as standing in front of lightning.

Personnel
Credits adapted from Tidal.

 24kGoldn – vocals
 Iann Dior – vocals
 Blake Slatkin – production, engineering, bass, guitar, programming
 Omer Fedi – production, bass, guitar, programming
 KBeazy – production, programming
 Chris Gehringer – mastering
 Manny Marroquin – mixing
 Robin Florent – mixing
 Ryan Adam Cantu – engineering
 Chris Galland – assistant engineering
 Jeremie Inhaber – assistant engineering

Charts

Weekly charts

Year-end charts

All-time charts

Certifications

Remix

An official remix of "Mood" was released on November 6, 2020, and featured vocals from Canadian singer Justin Bieber and Colombian singer J Balvin. Apart from verses by Bieber and Balvin, it also includes a new verse from 24kGoldn which replaces his verse on the original. An animated lyric video for the remix accompanied its release.

Reception
For Complex, Jordan Rose called Bieber and Balvin "perfect additions" to "Mood". Consequences Wren Graves wrote, "[Bieber and Balvin] both sound like nobody else on the planet, and the contrast helps 24kGoldn shine."

Certifications

Release history

See also
Billboard Year-End Hot 100 singles of 2020
List of Airplay 100 number ones of the 2020s
List of Billboard Adult Top 40 number-one songs of the 2020s
List of Billboard Hot 100 number ones of 2020
List of Billboard Hot 100 number ones of 2021
List of Billboard Mainstream Top 40 number-one songs of 2020
List of Billboard Rhythmic number-one songs of the 2020s
List of Billboard Streaming Songs number ones of 2020
List of Canadian Hot 100 number-one singles of 2020
List of Canadian Hot 100 number-one singles of 2021
List of number-one hits of 2020 (Austria)
List of number-one hits of 2020 (Denmark)
List of number-one hits of 2020 (Germany)
List of number-one hits of 2020 (Switzerland)
List of number-one R&B/hip-hop songs of 2020 (U.S.)
List of number-one singles from the 2020s (New Zealand)
List of number-one singles of 2020 (Australia)
List of number-one singles of 2020 (Ireland)
List of number-one singles of 2020 (Portugal)
List of number-one singles of the 2020s (Sweden)
List of number-one singles of 2021 (Australia)
List of number-one songs in Norway
List of number-one urban singles of 2020 (Australia)
List of number-one urban singles of 2021 (Australia)
List of Radio Songs number ones of the 2020s
List of Rolling Stone Top 100 number-one songs of 2020
List of UK R&B Singles Chart number ones of 2020
List of UK Singles Chart number ones of the 2020s

References

2020 singles
2020 songs
24kGoldn songs
Billboard Hot 100 number-one singles
Canadian Hot 100 number-one singles
Columbia Records singles
Iann Dior songs
Irish Singles Chart number-one singles
J Balvin songs
Justin Bieber songs
Number-one singles in Australia
Number-one singles in Austria
Number-one singles in Denmark
Number-one singles in Germany
Number-one singles in New Zealand
Number-one singles in Norway
Number-one singles in Portugal
Number-one singles in Romania
Number-one singles in Sweden
Number-one singles in Switzerland
UK Singles Chart number-one singles
Songs written by 24kGoldn
Songs written by Iann Dior
Songs written by KBeaZy
Songs written by Omer Fedi
Pop-rap songs
Rap rock songs
Viral videos